This is a list of valid extant and fossil species of the ant genus Pheidole in the subfamily myrmicine. There are over 1,000 valid species in this genus.

A

Pheidole aana Wilson & Taylor, 1967
Pheidole aberrans Mayr, 1868
Pheidole absurda Forel, 1886
Pheidole acamata Wilson, 2003
Pheidole acantha Eguchi, 2001
Pheidole accinota Wheeler, 1925
Pheidole aciculata Wilson, 2003 
Pheidole aculifera Wilson, 2003
Pheidole acutidens (Santschi, 1922)
Pheidole ademonia Wilson, 2003
Pheidole adrianoi Naves, 1985 
Pheidole aeberlii Forel, 1894
Pheidole aelloea Salata & Fisher, 2020
Pheidole aenescens Wilson, 2003
Pheidole aequiseta Santschi, 1923
Pheidole aglae Forel, 1913
Pheidole agricola Wilson, 2003
Pheidole ajax Forel, 1899
Pheidole ajaxigibba Longino, 2019
Pheidole akermani Arnold, 1920
Pheidole ala Salata & Fisher, 2020
Pheidole alacris Santschi, 1923
Pheidole alayoi Wilson, 2003
Pheidole albidula Santschi, 1928
Pheidole albipes Wilson, 2003
Pheidole alexeter Wilson, 2003
Pheidole alfaroi Emery, 1896
Pheidole alienata Borgmeier, 1929
Pheidole alina Salata & Fisher, 2020
Pheidole allani Bingham, 1903
Pheidole allarmata Wilson, 2003
Pheidole alpestris Wilson, 2003
Pheidole alpinensis Forel, 1912
Pheidole alticola Wilson, 2003
Pheidole amabilis Wilson, 2003
Pheidole amata Forel, 1901
Pheidole amazonica Wilson, 2003
Pheidole amber Donisthorpe, 1941
Pheidole ambigua Wilson, 2003
Pheidole ambohimanga Salata & Fisher, 2020
Pheidole ambonensis Karavaiev, 1930
Pheidole ampla Forel, 1893
Pheidole amplificata Viehmeyer, 1914
Pheidole analavelona Salata & Fisher, 2020
Pheidole anastasii Emery, 1896
Pheidole andapa Salata & Fisher, 2020
Pheidole andersoni Longino, 2019
Pheidole andohahela Salata & Fisher, 2020
Pheidole andrieui Santschi, 1930
Pheidole androsana Wheeler, 1905
Pheidole angulicollis Eguchi, 2001
Pheidole angulifera Wilson, 2003
Pheidole angusta Forel, 1908
Pheidole angusticeps Wilson, 2003
Pheidole angustinigra Longino, 2019
Pheidole anima Wilson, 2003
Pheidole ankerana Salata & Fisher, 2020
Pheidole annemariae Forel, 1918
Pheidole anomala Salata & Fisher, 2020
Pheidole anosyenne Salata & Fisher, 2020
Pheidole annexa Eguchi, 2001
Pheidole anthracina Forel, 1902
Pheidole anticua Casadei Ferreira, Chaul & Feitosa, 2019
Pheidole antillana Forel, 1893
Pheidole antranohofa Salata & Fisher, 2020
Pheidole antsahabe Salata & Fisher, 2020
Pheidole antipodum (Smith, 1858)
Pheidole aper Forel, 1912
Pheidole aphrasta Zhou & Zheng, 1999
Pheidole arachnion Wilson, 2003
Pheidole araneoides Wilson, 2003 
Pheidole arboricola Wilson, 2003
Pheidole arcifera Santschi, 1925
Pheidole arctos Wilson, 2003
Pheidole areniphila Forel, 1910
Pheidole argentina (Bruch, 1932)
Pheidole arhuaca Forel, 1901
Pheidole ariel Wilson, 2003
Pheidole aripoensis Wilson, 2003
Pheidole aristotelis Forel, 1911
Pheidole arnoldi Forel, 1913
Pheidole aspera Mayr, 1862
Pheidole asperata Emery, 1895
Pheidole asperithorax Emery, 1894
Pheidole aspidata Eguchi & Bui, 2005
Pheidole astur Wilson, 2003
Pheidole athertonensis Forel, 1915
Pheidole atitlana Longino, 2019
Pheidole atsirakambiaty Salata & Fisher, 2020
Pheidole atticola Forel, 1912
Pheidole atua Wilson & Taylor, 1967
Pheidole aurea Wilson, 2003
Pheidole aurivillii Mayr, 1896
Pheidole auropilosa Mayr, 1887
Pheidole avaratra Salata & Fisher, 2020
Pheidole avia Forel, 1908
Pheidole azteca Wilson, 2003

B

Pheidole bahai (Forel, 1922)
Pheidole bajaensis Wilson, 2003
Pheidole bakeri Forel, 1912
Pheidole balatro Longino, 2019
Pheidole balzani Emery, 1894
Pheidole bambusarum Forel, 1908
Pheidole bandata Bharti, 2004
Pheidole barbata Wheeler, 1908
Pheidole barreleti Forel, 1903
Pheidole barumtaun Donisthorpe, 1938
Pheidole batrachorum Wheeler, 1922
Pheidole beanka Salata & Fisher, 2020
Pheidole beauforti Emery, 1911
Pheidole befotaka Salata & Fisher, 2020
Pheidole bellatrix Wilson, 2003
Pheidole belli Mann, 1919
Pheidole beloceps Wilson, 2003
Pheidole belonorte Longino, 2019
Pheidole bemarahaensis Salata & Fisher, 2020
Pheidole bemarivoensis Salata & Fisher, 2020
Pheidole bequaerti Forel, 1913
Pheidole bergi Mayr, 1887
Pheidole besalon Longino, 2019
Pheidole bessonii Forel, 1891
Pheidole bicarinata Mayr, 1870
Pheidole biconstricta Mayr, 1870
Pheidole bicornis Forel, 1899
Pheidole bicornisculpta Longino, 2019
Pheidole bidens Wilson, 2003
Pheidole bifurca Donisthorpe, 1941
Pheidole bigote Longino, 2009
Pheidole bilimeki Mayr, 1870
Pheidole biloba (Karavaiev, 1935)
Pheidole binara Salata & Fisher, 2020
Pheidole binasifera Wilson, 2003
Pheidole binghamii Forel, 1902
Pheidole biolleyi Forel, 1908
Pheidole bison Wilson, 2003
Pheidole blumenauensis Kempf, 1964
Pheidole bluntschlii Forel, 1911
Pheidole boliviana Wilson, 2003
Pheidole boltoni Wilson, 2003
Pheidole borgmeieri Kempf, 1972
Pheidole boribora Salata & Fisher, 2020
Pheidole boruca Wilson, 2003
Pheidole bos Forel, 1893
Pheidole brachyops Wilson, 2003
Pheidole brandaoi Wilson, 2003
Pheidole branstetteri Longino, 2009
Pheidole braueri Forel, 1897
Pheidole brevicona Mayr, 1887
Pheidole brevicornis Salata & Fisher, 2020
Pheidole brevipilosa Mayr, 1876
Pheidole breviseta Santschi, 1919
Pheidole brownampla Longino, 2019
Pheidole browni Wilson, 2003
Pheidole bruchella Forel, 1915
Pheidole bruchi Forel, 1914
Pheidole bruesi Wheeler, 1911
Pheidole brunnescens Santschi, 1929
Pheidole bucculenta Forel, 1908
Pheidole buchholzi Mayr, 1901
Pheidole buckleyi Smith, 1951
Pheidole bufo Wilson, 2003
Pheidole bula Sarnat, 2008
Pheidole bulliceps Wilson, 2003
Pheidole bureni Wilson, 2003
Pheidole butteli Forel, 1913

C

Pheidole caffra Emery, 1895
Pheidole cahui Longino, 2019
Pheidole cairnsiana Forel, 1902
Pheidole caldwelli Mann, 1921
Pheidole calens Forel, 1901
Pheidole californica Mayr, 1870
Pheidole caliginosa Longino, 2019
Pheidole calimana Wilson, 2003
Pheidole caltrop Wilson, 2003
Pheidole cameroni Mayr, 1887
Pheidole camilla Wilson, 2003
Pheidole camptostela Kempf, 1972
Pheidole capellinii Emery, 1887
Pheidole capensis Mayr, 1862
Pheidole capillata Emery, 1906
Pheidole caracalla Wilson, 2003
Pheidole carapuna Mann, 1916
Pheidole carapunco Kusnezov, 1952
Pheidole cardiella Wilson, 2003
Pheidole cardinalis Wilson, 2003
Pheidole caribbaea Wheeler, 1911
Pheidole carinata Wilson, 2003
Pheidole cariniceps Eguchi, 2001
Pheidole carinitida Longino, 2019
Pheidole carinote Longino, 2009
Pheidole carrolli Naves, 1985
Pheidole casta Wheeler, 1908
Pheidole castanea (Smith, 1858)
Pheidole cataphracta Wilson, 2003
Pheidole cataractae Wheeler, 1916
Pheidole caulicola Wilson, 2003
Pheidole cavifrons Emery, 1906
Pheidole cavigenis Wheeler, 1915
Pheidole ceibana Wilson, 2003
Pheidole celaena Wilson, 2003
Pheidole centeotl Wheeler, 1914
Pheidole cerebrosior Wheeler, 1915
Pheidole ceres Wheeler, 1904
Pheidole cerina Wilson, 2003
Pheidole cervicornis Emery, 1900
Pheidole ceylonica (Motschoulsky, 1863)
Pheidole chalca Wheeler, 1914
Pheidole chalcoides Wilson, 2003
Pheidole charazana Wilson, 2003
Pheidole cheesmanae Donisthorpe, 1941
Pheidole cheesmannae Donisthorpe, 1941
Pheidole chilensis Mayr, 1862
Pheidole chloe Forel, 1908
Pheidole chocoensis Wilson, 2003
Pheidole christinae Fischer, Hita Garcia & Peters, 2012
Pheidole christopherseni Forel, 1912
Pheidole chrysops Wilson, 2003
Pheidole cielana Wilson, 2003
Pheidole cingulata (Smith, 1857)
Pheidole citrina Wilson, 2003
Pheidole clara Salata & Fisher, 2020
Pheidole clavata (Emery, 1877)
Pheidole claviscapa Santschi, 1925
Pheidole clementensis Gregg, 1969
Pheidole clydei Gregg, 1950
Pheidole clypeocornis Eguchi, 2001
Pheidole cocciphaga Borgmeier, 1934
Pheidole cockerelli Wheeler, 1908
Pheidole coffeicola Borgmeier, 1934
Pheidole colaensis Mann, 1921
Pheidole colobopsis Mann, 1916
Pheidole colpigaleata Eguchi, 2006
Pheidole comata Smith, 1858
Pheidole concentrica Forel, 1902
Pheidole concinna Santschi, 1910
Pheidole conficta Forel, 1902
Pheidole confoedusta Wheeler, 1909
Pheidole constanciae Forel, 1902
Pheidole constipata Wheeler, 1908
Pheidole coonoorensis Forel, 1902
Pheidole coracina Wilson, 2003
†Pheidole cordata Holl, 1829
Pheidole cordiceps Mayr, 1868
Pheidole corniclypeus Longino, 2019
Pheidole cornicula Wilson, 2003
Pheidole corticicola Santschi
Pheidole costaricensis Longino, 2019
Pheidole coveri Wilson, 2003
Pheidole cramptoni Wheeler, 1916
Pheidole crassicornis Emery, 1895
Pheidole crassinoda Emery, 1895
Pheidole creightoni Gregg, 1955
Pheidole crinita Wilson, 2003
Pheidole crozieri Wilson, 2003
Pheidole cryptocera Emery, 1900
Pheidole cubaensis Mayr, 1862
Pheidole cuevasi Wilson, 2003
Pheidole cuitensis Forel, 1910
Pheidole cuprina Wilson, 2003
Pheidole cursor Wilson, 2003
Pheidole curvistriata Salata & Fisher, 2020
Pheidole cusuco Longino, 2019
Pheidole cyrtostela Wilson, 2003

D

Pheidole dammermani Wheeler, 1924
Pheidole daphne Wilson, 2003
Pheidole darlingtoni Wheeler, 1936
Pheidole darwini Fischer, Hita Garcia & Peters, 2012
Pheidole dasos Salata & Fisher, 2020
Pheidole dasypyx Wilson, 2003
Pheidole davidsonae Wilson, 2003
Pheidole davisi Wheeler, 1905
Pheidole dea Santschi, 1921
Pheidole debilis Longino, 2009
Pheidole decarinata Santschi, 1929
Pheidole decem Forel, 1901
Pheidole decepticon Fischer & Fisher, 2013
Pheidole deceptrix Forel, 1899
Pheidole defecta Santschi, 1923
Pheidole deima Wilson, 2003
Pheidole delecta Forel, 1899
Pheidole delicata Wilson, 2003
Pheidole deltea Eguchi, 2001
Pheidole demeter Wilson, 2003
Pheidole dentata Mayr, 1886
Pheidole dentigula Smith, 1927
Pheidole depressinoda Longino, 2019
Pheidole descolei Kusnezov, 1952
Pheidole deserticola Forel, 1910
Pheidole desertorum Wheeler, 1906
Pheidole diabolus Wilson, 2003
Pheidole diakritos Salata & Fisher, 2020
Pheidole diana Forel, 1908
Pheidole diffidens (Walker, 1859)
Pheidole diffusa (Jerdon, 1851)
Pheidole diligens (Smith, 1858)
Pheidole dinophila Wilson, 2003
Pheidole dione Forel, 1913
Pheidole dispar (Forel, 1895)
Pheidole distincta Donisthorpe, 1943
Pheidole distorta Forel, 1899
Pheidole diversipilosa Wheeler, 1908
Pheidole dodo Fischer & Fisher, 2013
Pheidole dolon Wilson, 2003
Pheidole dorsata Wilson, 2003
Pheidole dossena Wilson, 2003
Pheidole drepanon Wilson, 2003
Pheidole drogon Sarnat, Fischer & Economo, 2016 
Pheidole dryas Wilson, 2003
Pheidole dugasi Forel, 1911
Pheidole dumicola Wilson, 2003
Pheidole duneraensis Bharti, 2001
Pheidole durionei Santschi, 1923
Pheidole dwyeri Gregg, 1969
Pheidole dyctiota Kempf, 1972

E

Pheidole ectatommoides Wilson, 2003
Pheidole ecuadorana Wilson, 2003
Pheidole ehazoara Salata & Fisher, 2020
Pheidole eidmanni Menozzi, 1926
Pheidole elecebra (Wheeler, 1904)
Pheidole elegans Donisthorpe, 1938
Pheidole elisae Emery, 1900
Pheidole elongicephala Eguchi, 2008
Pheidole embolopyx Brown, 1968
Pheidole emmae Forel, 1905
Pheidole ensifera Forel, 1897
Pheidole eosimilis Longino, 2019
Pheidole eowilsoni Longino, 2009
Pheidole eparmata Wilson, 2003
Pheidole epetrion Wilson, 2003
Pheidole epiphyta Longino, 2009
Pheidole erato Mann, 1919
Pheidole erethizon Wilson, 2003
Pheidole eriophora Wilson, 2003
Pheidole ernsti Forel, 1912
Pheidole erratilis Wilson, 2003
Pheidole escherichii Forel, 1910
Pheidole euryscopa Wilson, 2003
Pheidole exarata Emery, 1896
Pheidole exasperata (Mayr, 1866)
Pheidole excellens Mayr, 1862
Pheidole excubitor Wilson, 2003
Pheidole exigua Mayr, 1884
Pheidole exquisita Wilson, 2003

F

Pheidole fabricator (Smith, 1858)
Pheidole fadli Sharaf, 2007
Pheidole fallax Mayr, 1870
Pheidole familiaparra Longino, 2019
Pheidole fantasia Chapman, 1963
Pheidole fatigata Bolton, 1995
Pheidole feae Emery, 1895
Pheidole fera Santschi, 1925
Pheidole fergusoni Forel, 1902
Pheidole ferruginea Salata & Fisher, 2020
Pheidole fervens Smith, 1858
Pheidole fervida Smith, 1874
Pheidole fimbriata Roger, 1863
Pheidole fincanaranjo Longino, 2019
Pheidole fiorii Emery, 1890
Pheidole fisaka Salata & Fisher, 2020
Pheidole fissiceps Wilson, 2003
Pheidole fitarata Salata & Fisher, 2020
Pheidole flammea Salata & Fisher, 2020
Pheidole flavens Roger, 1863
Pheidole flaveria Zhou & Zheng, 1999
Pheidole flavida Mayr, 1887
Pheidole flavifrons Wilson, 2003
Pheidole flavodepressa Salata & Fisher, 2020
Pheidole flavominuta Salata & Fisher, 2020
Pheidole flavothoracica Viehmeyer, 1914
Pheidole floricola Wilson, 2003
Pheidole floridana Emery, 1895
Pheidole foederalis Borgmeier, 1928
Pheidole foreli Mayr, 1901
Pheidole fortis Eguchi, 2006
Pheidole fossimandibula Longino, 2009
Pheidole foveolata Eguchi, 2006
Pheidole fowleri Wilson, 2003
Pheidole fracticeps Wilson, 2003
Pheidole fullerae Wilson, 2003
Pheidole funki LaPolla & Cover, 2005
Pheidole funkikoensis Wheeler, 1929
Pheidole furcata Sarnat, 2008
Pheidole furtiva Wilson, 2003
Pheidole fuscula Emery, 1900

G

Pheidole gagates Wilson, 2003
Pheidole gaigei Forel, 1914
Pheidole galba Wilson, 2003
Pheidole gambogia Donisthorpe, 1948
Pheidole gangamon Wilson, 2003
Pheidole gatesi (Wheeler, 1927)
Pheidole gauthieri Forel, 1901
Pheidole gellibrandi Clark, 1934
Pheidole geminata Wilson, 2003
Pheidole gemmula Wilson, 2003
Pheidole geraesensis Santschi, 1929
Pheidole germaini Emery, 1896
Pheidole gertrudae Forel, 1886
Pheidole ghatica Forel, 1902
Pheidole ghigii Emery, 1900
Pheidole gibba Mayr, 1887
Pheidole gibbata Borgmeier, 1934
Pheidole gigaflavens Wilson, 2003
Pheidole gigas Wilson, 2003
Pheidole gigliolii Menozzi, 1935
Pheidole gilva Wilson, 2003
Pheidole gilvescens Creighton & Gregg, 1955
Pheidole glabra Salata & Fisher, 2020
Pheidole glabrella Fischer, Hita Garcia & Peters, 2012
Pheidole globularia Wilson, 2003
Pheidole glomericeps Wilson, 2003
Pheidole gnomus Wilson, 2003
Pheidole goavana Salata & Fisher, 2020
Pheidole godmani Forel, 1893
Pheidole goeldii Forel, 1895
Pheidole gombakensis Eguchi, 2001
Pheidole gouldi Forel, 1886
Pheidole gracilescens (Smith, 1860)
Pheidole gracilis Salata & Fisher, 2020
Pheidole gracilipes (Motschoulsky, 1863)
Pheidole gradifer Wilson, 2003
Pheidole grallatrix Emery, 1899
Pheidole grandinodus Wilson, 2003
Pheidole granulata Pergande, 1896
Pheidole gravida Wilson, 2003
Pheidole grayi Forel, 1902
Pheidole grex Wilson, 2003
Pheidole grundmanni Smith, 1953
Pheidole guajirana Wilson, 2003
Pheidole guayasana Wilson, 2003
Pheidole guerrerana Wilson, 2003
Pheidole guilelmimuelleri Forel, 1886
Pheidole guineensis (Fabricius, 1793)
Pheidole gulo Wilson, 2003
Pheidole gymnoceras Longino, 2009

H

Pheidole haboka Salata & Fisher, 2020
Pheidole hainanensis Chen, Ye, Lu & Zhou, 2011
Pheidole hamtoni Wilson, 2003
Pheidole hansoni Longino, 2019
Pheidole harlequina Wilson, 2003
Pheidole harrisonfordi Wilson, 2003
Pheidole hartmeyeri Forel, 1907
Pheidole haskinsorum Wilson, 2003
Pheidole hasticeps Wilson, 2003
Pheidole havilandi Forel, 1911
Pheidole havoana Salata & Fisher, 2020
Pheidole haywardi Kusnezov, 1952
Pheidole hazenae Wilson, 2003
Pheidole hazo Salata & Fisher, 2020
Pheidole hecate Wheeler, 1911
Pheidole hector Wilson, 2003
Pheidole hectornitida Longino, 2019
Pheidole hedlundorum Wilson, 2003
Pheidole heliosa Fischer, Hita Garcia & Peters, 2012
Pheidole hercules Donisthorpe, 1941
Pheidole heterothrix Santschi, 1923
Pheidole hetschkoi Emery, 1896
Pheidole hewitti Santschi, 1932
Pheidole heyeri Forel, 1899
Pheidole hierax Wilson, 2003
Pheidole hirsuta Emery, 1896
Pheidole hirtula Forel, 1899
Pheidole hispaniolae Wilson, 2003
Pheidole hitoy Longino, 2019
Pheidole hizemops Wilson, 2003
Pheidole hoelldobleri Wilson, 2003
Pheidole hongkongensis Wheeler, 1928
Pheidole hoplitica Wilson, 2003
Pheidole horni Emery, 1901
Pheidole horribilis Wilson, 2003
Pheidole hortensis Forel, 1913
Pheidole hortonae Wilson, 2003
Pheidole hospes Smith, 1865
Pheidole hospita Bingham, 1903
Pheidole huacana Wilson, 2003
Pheidole huarache Longino, 2019
Pheidole huberi Forel, 1911
Pheidole huilana Wilson, 2003
Pheidole humeralis Wheeler, 1908
Pheidole humeridens Wilson, 2003
Pheidole hyatti Emery, 1895

I

Pheidole imbrilis Longino, 2019
Pheidole impariceps Santschi, 1923
Pheidole iceni Fernández, 2011
Pheidole impressa Mayr, 1870
Pheidole impressiceps Mayr, 1876
Pheidole inca Wilson, 2003
Pheidole incerta (Smith, 1863)
Pheidole incisa Mayr, 1870
Pheidole incurvata Viehmeyer, 1924
Pheidole indagarama Longino, 2019
Pheidole indagatrix Wilson, 2003
Pheidole indica Mayr, 1879
Pheidole indosinensis Wheeler, 1928
Pheidole industa Santschi, 1939
Pheidole inermis Mayr, 1870
Pheidole infernalis Wilson, 2003
Pheidole inflexa Santschi, 1923
Pheidole innotata Mayr, 1866
Pheidole innupta Menozzi, 1931
Pheidole inornata Eguchi, 2001
Pheidole inquilina (Wheeler, 1903)
Pheidole inscrobiculata Viehmeyer, 1916
Pheidole insipida Forel, 1899
Pheidole inversa Forel, 1901
Pheidole irritans (Smith, 1858)
Pheidole isis Mann, 1919
Pheidole itremo Salata & Fisher, 2020

J

Pheidole jacobsoni Forel, 1911
Pheidole jaculifera Wilson, 2003
Pheidole jamaicensis Wheeler, 1908
Pheidole janzeni Longino, 2009
Pheidole jeannei Wilson, 2003
Pheidole jelskii Mayr, 1884
Pheidole jivaro Wilson, 2003
Pheidole joffreville Salata & Fisher, 2020
Pheidole jonas Forel, 1907
Pheidole jordanica Saulcy, 1874
Pheidole jubilans Forel, 1911
Pheidole jucunda Forel, 1885
Pheidole jujuyensis Forel, 1913
Pheidole juniperae Wilson, 2003

K

Pheidole karolmorae Longino, 2009
Pheidole karolsetosa Longino, 2009
Pheidole kasparii Longino, 2019
Pheidole kava Fischer, Sarnat & Economo, 2016
Pheidole kelainos Longino, 2019
Pheidole katonae Forel, 1907
Pheidole kikutai Eguchi, 2001
Pheidole kely Salata & Fisher, 2020
Pheidole kitschneri Forel, 1910
Pheidole knowlesi Mann, 1921
Pheidole kochi (Emery, 1911)
Pheidole kohli Mayr, 1901
Pheidole komori Fischer & Fisher, 2013
Pheidole kugleri Wilson, 2003
Pheidole kukrana Wilson, 2003
Pheidole kuna Wilson, 2003
Pheidole kusnezovi Wilson, 2003

L

Pheidole laelaps Wilson, 2003
Pheidole laevicolor Eguchi, 2006
Pheidole laevifrons Mayr, 1887
Pheidole laevinota Forel, 1908
Pheidole laevithorax Eguchi, 2008
Pheidole laeviventris Mayr, 1870
Pheidole laevivertex Forel, 1901
Pheidole lagunculiminor Longino, 2019
Pheidole lagunculinoda Longino, 2009
Pheidole laidlowi Mann, 1916
Pheidole lamancha Longino, 2019
Pheidole lamellinoda Forel, 1902
Pheidole lamia Wheeler, 1901
Pheidole laminata Emery, 1900
Pheidole lamperos Salata & Fisher, 2020
Pheidole lancifera Wilson, 2003
Pheidole lanigera Wilson, 2003
Pheidole lanuginosa Wilson, 1984
Pheidole laselva Wilson, 2003
Pheidole laselvoides Longino, 2019
Pheidole laticornis Wilson, 2003
Pheidole laticrista Santschi, 1916
Pheidole latinoda Roger, 1863
Pheidole lattkei Wilson, 2003
Pheidole laudatana Wilson, 2003
Pheidole lavasoa Salata & Fisher, 2020
Pheidole lemnisca Wilson, 2003
Pheidole lemur Forel, 1912
Pheidole leoncortesi Longino, 2009
Pheidole leonina Wilson, 2003
Pheidole leptina Wilson, 2003
Pheidole liengmei Forel, 1894
Pheidole lignicola Mayr, 1887
Pheidole lilloi (Kusnezov, 1952)
Pheidole lineafrons Longino, 2019
Pheidole liteae Forel, 1910
Pheidole littoralis Cole, 1952
Pheidole lobulata Emery, 1900
Pheidole loki Fischer & Fisher, 2013
Pheidole lokitae Forel, 1913
Pheidole longiceps Mayr, 1876
Pheidole longicornis Emery, 1888
Pheidole longinoi Wilson, 2003
Pheidole longior Santschi, 1933
Pheidole longipes (Latreille, 1802)
Pheidole longipilosa Salata & Fisher, 2020
Pheidole longiscapa Forel, 1901
Pheidole longiseta Wilson, 2003
Pheidole longispinosa Forel, 1891
Pheidole lourothi Wilson, 2003
Pheidole lovejoyi Wilson, 2003
Pheidole lucaris Wilson, 2003
Pheidole lucida Forel, 1895
Pheidole lucioccipitalis Eguchi, 2001
Pheidole lucretii Santschi, 1923
Pheidole lupus Wilson, 2003
Pheidole lustrata Wilson, 2003
Pheidole lutea Salata & Fisher, 2020
Pheidole luteagossamer Longino, 2019
Pheidole luteipes Emery, 1914
Pheidole lutzi Forel, 1905

M

Pheidole macclendoni Wheeler, 1908
Pheidole machaquila Longino, 2019
Pheidole machetula Wilson, 2003
Pheidole mackayi Wilson, 2003
Pheidole macracantha Wilson, 2003
Pheidole macromischoides Wilson, 2003
Pheidole macrops Wilson, 2003
Pheidole maculifrons Wheeler, 1929
Pheidole madecassa Forel, 1892
Pheidole madinika Salata & Fisher, 2020
Pheidole madrensis Wilson, 2003
Pheidole magna Eguchi, 2006
Pheidole magrettii Emery, 1887
Pheidole mahaboensis Salata & Fisher, 2020
Pheidole mahamavo Salata & Fisher, 2020
Pheidole mainty Salata & Fisher, 2020
Pheidole maizina Salata & Fisher, 2020
Pheidole maja Forel, 1886
Pheidole makaensis Salata & Fisher, 2020
Pheidole makilingi Viehmeyer, 1916
Pheidole makirovana Salata & Fisher, 2020
Pheidole malabarica (Jerdon, 1851)
Pheidole malinsii Forel, 1902
Pheidole mallota Wilson, 2003
Pheidole mamiratra Salata & Fisher, 2020
Pheidole mamore Mann, 1916
Pheidole manantenensis Salata & Fisher, 2020
Pheidole manantenina Salata & Fisher, 2020
Pheidole mantadia Salata & Fisher, 2020
Pheidole mantadioflava Salata & Fisher, 2020
Pheidole manteroi Emery, 1897
Pheidole mantilla Wilson, 2003
Pheidole manuana Wilson, 2003
Pheidole manukana Eguchi, 2001
Pheidole marcidula Wheeler, 1908
Pheidole marieannae Salata & Fisher, 2020
Pheidole marmor Longino, 2019
Pheidole maro Salata & Fisher, 2020
Pheidole masoala Salata & Fisher, 2020
Pheidole masoandro Salata & Fisher, 2020
Pheidole maufei Arnold, 1920
Pheidole mavesatra Salata & Fisher, 2020
Pheidole mavohavoana Salata & Fisher, 2020
Pheidole mayri Forel, 1894
Pheidole medioflava Donisthorpe, 1941
Pheidole megacephala (Fabricius, 1793)
Pheidole megatron Fischer & Fisher, 2013
Pheidole meihuashanensis Li & Chen, 1992
Pheidole meinerti Forel, 1905
Pheidole meinertopsis Wilson, 2003
Pheidole melanogaster Donisthorpe, 1943
Pheidole melastomae Wilson, 2003
Pheidole mendanai Mann, 1919
Pheidole mendicula Mann, 1919
Pheidole mentita Santschi, 1914
Pheidole mera Wilson, 2003
Pheidole merimbun Eguchi, 2001
Pheidole mesomontana Longino, 2009
Pheidole metallescens Emery, 1895
Pheidole metana Wilson, 2003
Pheidole micon Wilson, 2003
Pheidole micridris Wilson, 2003
Pheidole microgyna Wheeler, 1928
Pheidole microps Wilson, 2003
Pheidole micula Wheeler, 1915
Pheidole midas Wilson, 2003
Pheidole midongy Salata & Fisher, 2020
Pheidole mikros Salata & Fisher, 2020
Pheidole militicida Wheeler, 1915
Pheidole minax Wilson, 2003
Pheidole minensis Santschi, 1923
Pheidole minima Mayr, 1901
Pheidole minor (Jerdon, 1851)
Pheidole minuscula Bernard, 1953
Pheidole minutula Mayr, 1878
Pheidole mirabilis Wilson, 2003
Pheidole miramila Salata & Fisher, 2020
Pheidole miseranda Wheeler, 1924
Pheidole mittermeieri Wilson, 2003
Pheidole mivory Salata & Fisher, 2020
Pheidole mixteca Wilson, 2003
Pheidole mjobergi Forel, 1915
Pheidole modiglianii Emery, 1900
Pheidole moerens Wheeler, 1908
Pheidole moffetti Wilson, 2003
Pheidole monstrosa Wilson, 2003
Pheidole montana Eguchi, 1999
Pheidole monteverdensis Wilson, 2003
Pheidole mooreorum Wilson, 2003
Pheidole moramanaensis Salata & Fisher, 2020
Pheidole morelosana Wilson, 2003
Pheidole morrisii Forel, 1886
Pheidole moseni Wheeler, 1925
Pheidole mosenopsis Wilson, 2003
Pheidole moskitia Longino, 2019
Pheidole multidens Forel, 1902
Pheidole multispina Wilson, 2003
Pheidole muralla Longino, 2019
Pheidole mus Forel, 1902
Pheidole musacolor Longino, 2019
Pheidole musinermis Longino, 2019
Pheidole mutisi Fernández & Wilson, 2008
Pheidole mylognatha Wheeler, 1922

N

Pheidole nana Emery, 1894
Pheidole naoroji Forel, 1902
Pheidole napoensis Wilson, 2003
Pheidole nasifera Wilson, 2003
Pheidole nasutoides Hölldobler & Wilson, 1992
Pheidole natalie Longino, 2019
Pheidole navoatrensis Salata & Fisher, 2020
Pheidole naylae Wilson, 2003
Pheidole nebulosa Wilson, 2003
Pheidole nemoralis Forel, 1892
Pheidole neokohli Wilson, 1984
Pheidole neolongiceps Brown, 1950
Pheidole neolongiscapa Özdikmen, 2010
Pheidole neoschultzi LaPolla, 2006
Pheidole nephele Longino, 2019
Pheidole nesiota Wilson, 2003
Pheidole nietneri Emery, 1901
Pheidole nigella Emery, 1894
Pheidole nigeriensis Santschi, 1914
Pheidole nigricula Wilson, 2003
Pheidole nigritella Bernard, 1953
Pheidole nimba Bernard, 1953
Pheidole nindi Mann, 1919
Pheidole nitella Wilson, 2003
Pheidole nitidicollis Emery, 1896
Pheidole nitidobruna Salata & Fisher, 2020
Pheidole nitidula Emery, 1888
Pheidole njassae Viehmeyer, 1914
Pheidole noar Wilson, 2003
Pheidole noda Smith, 1874
Pheidole nodgii Forel, 1905
Pheidole nodifera (Smith, 1858)
Pheidole nubicola Wilson, 2003
Pheidole nubila Emery, 1906
Pheidole nuculiceps Wheeler, 1908

O

Pheidole oaxacana Wilson, 2003
Pheidole obnixa Forel, 1912
Pheidole obrima Wilson, 2003
Pheidole obscurifrons Santschi, 1925
Pheidole obscurithorax Naves, 1985
Pheidole obturaculum Longino, 2019
Pheidole obtusopilosa Mayr, 1887
Pheidole obtusospinosa Pergande, 1896
Pheidole occipitalis André, 1890
Pheidole oceanica Mayr, 1866
Pheidole ocellata Zhou, 2001
Pheidole ochracea Eguchi, 2008
Pheidole oculata (Emery, 1899)
Pheidole ocypodea Salata & Fisher, 2020
Pheidole oliveirai Wilson, 2003
Pheidole olsoni Wilson, 2003
Pheidole onifera Mann, 1921
Pheidole onyx Wilson, 2003
Pheidole opaciventris Mayr, 1876
Pheidole optiva Forel, 1901
Pheidole orbica Forel, 1893
Pheidole oswaldi Forel, 1891
Pheidole otisi Wilson, 2003
Pheidole oxyops Forel, 1908
Pheidole ovalinoda Salata & Fisher, 2020

P

Pheidole paiute Gregg, 1959
Pheidole palenquensis Wilson, 2003
Pheidole pallidula (Nylander, 1849)
Pheidole pampana Santschi, 1929
Pheidole paraensis Wilson, 2003
Pheidole pararugiceps Longino, 2009
Pheidole parasitica Wilson, 1984
Pheidole pariana Wilson, 2003
Pheidole parva Mayr, 1865
Pheidole parviocula Salata & Fisher, 2020
Pheidole parvula Salata & Fisher, 2020
Pheidole parvulogibba Salata & Fisher, 2020
Pheidole passivaeferox Longino, 2019
Pheidole parvicorpus Eguchi, 2001
Pheidole peckorum Wilson, 2003
Pheidole pedana Wilson, 2003
Pheidole pegasus Sarnat, 2008
Pheidole peguensis Emery, 1895
Pheidole pelor Wilson, 2003
Pheidole peltastes Wilson, 2003
Pheidole penetralis Smith, 1863
Pheidole pepo Wilson, 2003
Pheidole peregrina Wheeler, 1916
Pheidole perissothrix Longino, 2019
Pheidole perkinsi Wilson, 2003
Pheidole perpilosa Wilson, 2003
Pheidole perpusilla Emery, 1894
Pheidole perryorum Wilson, 2003
Pheidole peruviana Wilson, 2003
Pheidole petrensis Wilson, 2003
Pheidole phanigaster Longino, 2009
Pheidole philemon Forel, 1910
Pheidole philippi Emery, 1915
Pheidole phipsoni Forel, 1902
Pheidole pholeops Wilson, 2003
Pheidole picea (Buckley, 1866)
Pheidole piceonigra Emery, 1922
Pheidole picobarva Longino, 2009
Pheidole pidax Wilson, 2003
Pheidole pieli Santschi, 1925
Pheidole pilifera (Roger, 1863)
Pheidole pilispina Wilson, 2003
Pheidole piliventris (Smith, 1858)
Pheidole pilosior Wilson, 2003
Pheidole pinealis Wheeler, 1908
Pheidole pinicola Wilson, 2003
Pheidole plagiaria Smith, 1860
Pheidole planidorsum Eguchi, 2001
Pheidole planifrons Santschi, 1920
Pheidole plato Wilson, 2003
Pheidole platypus Crawley, 1915
Pheidole platyscapa Longino, 2019
Pheidole plebecula Forel, 1899
Pheidole plinii Forel, 1911
Pheidole podargea Salata & Fisher, 2020
Pheidole polita Emery, 1894
Pheidole polymorpha Wilson, 2003
Pheidole porcula Wheeler, 1908
Pheidole poringensis Eguchi, 2001
Pheidole portalensis Wilson, 2003
Pheidole potosiana Wilson, 2003
Pheidole praegrandis Salata & Fisher, 2020
Pheidole praeses Wilson, 2003
Pheidole praeusta Roger, 1863
Pheidole prattorum Wilson, 2003
Pheidole prelli Forel, 1911
†Pheidole primigenia Baroni Urbani, 1995
Pheidole probolonotum Longino, 2019
Pheidole pronotalis Forel, 1902
Pheidole prostrata Wilson, 2003
Pheidole protaxi Longino, 2019
Pheidole protea Forel, 1912
Pheidole protensa Wilson, 2003
Pheidole providens (Sykes, 1835)
Pheidole proxima Mayr, 1876
Pheidole psammophila Creighton & Gregg, 1955
Pheidole psilogaster Wilson, 2003
Pheidole pubiventris Mayr, 1887
Pheidole pugnax Dalla Torre, 1892
Pheidole pulchella Santschi, 1910
Pheidole pullula Santschi, 1911
Pheidole punctatissima Mayr, 1870
Pheidole punctithorax Borgmeier, 1929
Pheidole punctulata Mayr, 1866
Pheidole purpurascens Emery, 1897
Pheidole purpurea Longino, 2009
Pheidole puttemansi Forel, 1911
Pheidole pygmaea Wilson, 2003
Pheidole pyriformis Clark, 1938

Q

Pheidole quadrensis Forel, 1900
Pheidole quadriceps Wilson, 2003
Pheidole quadricuspis Emery, 1900
Pheidole quadriprojecta Smith, 1947
Pheidole quadrispinosa (Smith, 1865)
Pheidole quercicola Wilson, 2003
Pheidole quiaccana Wheeler, 1925
Pheidole quinata Eguchi, 2000

R

Pheidole rabo Forel, 1913
Pheidole radoszkowskii Mayr, 1884
Pheidole ragnax Fischer & Fisher, 2013
Pheidole ranohirensis Salata & Fisher, 2020
†Pheidole rasnitsyni Dubovikoff, 2011
Pheidole rebeccae Fischer, Hita Garcia & Peters, 2012
Pheidole reclusi Forel, 1899
Pheidole recondita Clouse, 2007
Pheidole rectisentis Wilson, 2003
Pheidole rectispina Wilson, 2003
Pheidole rectitrudis Wilson, 2003
Pheidole reflexans Santschi, 1933
Pheidole reichenspergeri Santschi, 1923
Pheidole renae Wilson, 2003
Pheidole renirano Salata & Fisher, 2020
Pheidole retivertex Eguchi, 2001
Pheidole retronitens Santschi, 1930
Pheidole rhea Wheeler, 1908
Pheidole rhinoceros Forel, 1899
Pheidole rhinomontana Longino, 2009
Pheidole rhytifera Wilson, 2003
Pheidole ridicula Wheeler, 1916
Pheidole rima Longino, 2019
Pheidole rinae Emery, 1900
Pheidole risii Forel, 1892
Pheidole riveti Santschi, 1911
Pheidole roberti Forel, 1902
Pheidole rochai Forel, 1912
Pheidole rogeri Emery, 1896
Pheidole rogeripolita Longino, 2019
Pheidole rogersi Forel, 1902
Pheidole rohani Santschi, 1925
Pheidole roosevelti Mann, 1921
Pheidole rosae Forel, 1901
Pheidole rosula Wilson, 2003
Pheidole rotundiceps Wilson, 2003
Pheidole roushae Wilson, 2003
Pheidole rubiceps Wilson, 2003
Pheidole rudigenis Emery, 1906
Pheidole ruficeps (Smith, 1861)
Pheidole rufipilis Forel, 1908
Pheidole rugaticeps Emery, 1877
Pheidole rugatula Santschi, 1933
Pheidole rugiceps Wilson, 2003
Pheidole rugifera Eguchi, 2001
Pheidole rugithorax Eguchi, 2008
Pheidole rugocephala Salata & Fisher, 2020
Pheidole rugofitarata Salata & Fisher, 2020
Pheidole rugosa Smith, 1858
Pheidole rugulosa Gregg, 1959
Pheidole rutilana Wilson, 2003
Pheidole ryukyuensis Ogata, 1982

S

Pheidole sabahna Eguchi, 2000
Pheidole sabella Wilson, 2003
Pheidole sabina Wilson, 2003
Pheidole sagax Wilson, 2003
Pheidole sagei Forel, 1902
Pheidole sagittaria Wilson, 2003
Pheidole sarawakana Forel, 1911
Pheidole sarcina Forel, 1912
Pheidole sarpedon Wilson, 2003
Pheidole sauberi Forel, 1905
Pheidole sauteri Wheeler, 1909
Pheidole sava Salata & Fisher, 2020
Pheidole savegre Longino, 2019
Pheidole saxicola Wheeler, 1922
Pheidole sayapensis Eguchi, 2001
Pheidole scabriuscula Gerstäcker, 1871
Pheidole scalaris Wilson, 2003
Pheidole scapulata Santschi, 1923
Pheidole schmalzi Emery, 1894
Pheidole schoedli Eguchi, Hashimoto & Malsch, 2006
Pheidole schoutedeni Forel, 1913
Pheidole schultzei Forel, 1910
Pheidole schwarzmaieri Borgmeier, 1939
Pheidole sciara Cole, 1955
Pheidole scimitara Wilson, 2003
Pheidole sciophila Wheeler, 1908
Pheidole scolioceps Wilson, 2003
Pheidole scrobifera Emery, 1896
Pheidole sculptior Forel, 1893
Pheidole sculpturata Mayr, 1866
Pheidole sebofila Longino, 2009
Pheidole securigera Wilson, 2003
Pheidole seeldrayersi Forel, 1910
Pheidole selathorax Zhou, 2001
Pheidole seligmanni Wilson, 2003
Pheidole semidea Fischer, Hita Garcia & Peters, 2012
Pheidole semilaevis Forel, 1901
Pheidole senex Gregg, 1952
Pheidole senilis Santschi, 1929
Pheidole sensipelada Longino, 2019
Pheidole sensitiva Borgmeier, 1959
Pheidole sepulchralis Bingham, 1903
Pheidole sepultura Longino, 2019
Pheidole sericella Viehmeyer, 1914
Pheidole servilia Wilson, 2003
Pheidole setosa Fischer, Hita Garcia & Peters, 2012
Pheidole setsukoae Wilson, 2003
Pheidole severini Forel, 1904
Pheidole sexdentata Donisthorpe, 1948
Pheidole sexspinosa Mayr, 1870
Pheidole sharpi Forel, 1902
Pheidole sicaria Wilson, 2003
Pheidole sigillata Wilson, 2003
Pheidole sikorae Forel, 1891
Pheidole similigena Wheeler, 1937
Pheidole similis Salata & Fisher, 2020
Pheidole simoni Emery, 1893
Pheidole simonsi Wilson, 2003
Pheidole simplex Wheeler, 1925
Pheidole simplispinosa Sarnat, 2008
Pheidole sinaitica Mayr, 1862
Pheidole singaporensis Özdikmen, 2010
Pheidole singularis Smith, 1863
Pheidole sinica (Wu & Wang, 1992)
Pheidole sitiens Wilson, 2003
Pheidole skwarrae Wheeler, 1934
Pheidole smythiesii Forel, 1902
Pheidole socrates Forel, 1912
Pheidole soesilae Makhan, 2007
Pheidole sofia Salata & Fisher, 2020
Pheidole soritis Wheeler, 1908
Pheidole sospes Forel, 1908
Pheidole spadonia Wheeler, 1915
Pheidole sparsa Salata & Fisher, 2020
Pheidole sparsisculpta Longino, 2009
Pheidole spathicornis Wilson, 2003
Pheidole spathifera Forel, 1902
Pheidole spathipilosa Wilson, 2003
Pheidole specularis Wilson, 2003
Pheidole speculifera Emery, 1877
Pheidole sperata Forel, 1915
Pheidole sphaerica Wilson, 2003
Pheidole spilota Wilson, 2003
Pheidole spinicornis Eguchi, 2001
Pheidole spininodis Mayr, 1887
Pheidole spinoda (Smith, 1858)
Pheidole spinulosa Forel, 1910
Pheidole squalida Santschi, 1910
Pheidole steinheili Forel, 1901
Pheidole stigma Wilson, 2003
Pheidole stomachosa Wheeler, 1917
Pheidole strator Forel, 1910
Pheidole striata 
Pheidole striaticeps Donisthorpe, 1947
Pheidole strigosa Wilson, 2003
Pheidole stulta Forel, 1886
Pheidole styrax Wilson, 2003
Pheidole subaberrans (Kusnezov, 1952)
Pheidole subarmata Mayr, 1884
Pheidole submonticola Eguchi, 2001
Pheidole subnuda Wilson, 2003
Pheidole subreticulata Emery, 1894
Pheidole subsphaerica Wilson, 2003
Pheidole sulcaticeps Roger, 1863
Pheidole superba Wilson, 2003
Pheidole susannae Forel, 1886
Pheidole susanowo Onoyama & Terayama, 1999
Pheidole sykesii Forel, 1902
Pheidole symbiotica Wasmann, 1909
Pheidole synanthropica Longino, 2009
Pheidole synarmata Wilson, 2003

T

Pheidole tachigaliae Wheeler, 1921
Pheidole tachirana Wilson, 2003
Pheidole taipoana Wheeler, 1928
Pheidole taivanensis Forel, 1912
Pheidole tambopatae Wilson, 2003
Pheidole tampony Salata & Fisher, 2020
Pheidole tandjongensis Forel, 1913
Pheidole tanyscapa Wilson, 2003
Pheidole tapanti Longino, 2019
Pheidole tarchon Wilson, 2003
Pheidole tasmaniensis Mayr, 1866
Pheidole taurus Emery, 1906
Pheidole tawauensis Eguchi, 2001
Pheidole templaria Forel, 1902
Pheidole tenebricosa Eguchi, 2001
Pheidole tenebrovulgaris Salata & Fisher, 2020
Pheidole tenerescens Wheeler, 1922
Pheidole teneriffana Forel, 1893
Pheidole tennantae Wilson, 2003
Pheidole tenuicephala Longino, 2009
Pheidole tenuiclavata Donisthorpe, 1943
Pheidole tenuinodis Mayr, 1901
Pheidole tenuis Wilson, 2003
Pheidole tepicana Pergande, 1896
Pheidole tepuicola Wilson, 2003
Pheidole termitobia Forel, 1901
Pheidole termitophila Forel, 1904
Pheidole terraceensis Bharti, 2001
Pheidole terresi Wheeler & Mann, 1914
Pheidole terribilis Wilson, 2003
†Pheidole tertiaria Carpenter, 1930
†Pheidole tethepa Wilson, 1985
Pheidole tetra Creighton, 1950
Pheidole tetracantha Emery, 1897
Pheidole tetrica Forel, 1913
Pheidole tetroides Wilson, 2003
Pheidole texana Wheeler, 1903
Pheidole texticeps Wilson, 2003
Pheidole thrasys Wilson, 2003
Pheidole tigris Wilson, 2003
Pheidole tijucana Borgmeier, 1927
Pheidole tikal Longino, 2019
Pheidole tillandsiarum Wheeler, 1934
Pheidole tinamu Longino, 2019
Pheidole tisiphone Wheeler, 1911
Pheidole titanis Wheeler, 1903
Pheidole tjibodana Forel, 1905
Pheidole tobini Wilson, 2003
Pheidole tolteca Forel, 1901
Pheidole torosa Wilson, 2003
Pheidole trachyderma Emery, 1906
Pheidole trageri Wilson, 2003
Pheidole tragica Wheeler, 1934
Pheidole traini Wilson, 2003
Pheidole transfigens Forel, 1911
Pheidole transversostriata Mayr, 1887
Pheidole trapezoidea Viehmeyer, 1914
Pheidole tricarinata Santschi, 1914
Pheidole trichotos Salata & Fisher, 2020
Pheidole tricolor Donisthorpe, 1949
Pheidole triconstricta Forel, 1886
Pheidole trinitatis Wilson, 2003
Pheidole triplex Wilson, 2003
Pheidole tristicula Wilson, 2003
Pheidole tristis (Smith, 1858)
Pheidole tristops Wilson, 2003
Pheidole truncula Wilson, 2003
Pheidole tsaravoniana Salata & Fisher, 2020
Pheidole tschinkeli Wilson, 2003
Pheidole tsontekonwei Longino, 2019
Pheidole tucsonica Wheeler, 1908
Pheidole tuculutan Longino, 2019
Pheidole tumida Eguchi, 2008
Pheidole turneri Forel, 1902
Pheidole tuxtlasana Wilson, 2003
Pheidole typhlos Salata & Fisher, 2020
Pheidole tysoni Forel, 1901

U

Pheidole ulothrix Wilson, 2003
Pheidole ululevu Fischer & Sarnat & Economo, 2016
Pheidole umbonata Mayr, 1870
Pheidole umphreyi Wilson, 2003
Pheidole uncagena Sarnat, 2008
Pheidole unicornis Wilson, 2003
Pheidole upeneci Forel, 1913
Pheidole uranus Salata & Fisher, 2020
Pheidole ursus Mayr, 1870

V

Pheidole vadum Salata & Fisher, 2020
Pheidole vafella Wheeler, 1925
Pheidole vafra Santschi, 1923
Pheidole valens Wilson, 2003
Pheidole vallicola Wheeler, 1915
Pheidole vallifica Forel, 1901
Pheidole vanderveldi Forel, 1913
Pheidole variabilis Mayr, 1876
Pheidole variolosa Emery, 1892
Pheidole vatovavensis Salata & Fisher, 2020
Pheidole vatu Mann, 1921
Pheidole veletis Wilson, 2003
Pheidole velox Emery, 1887
Pheidole venatrix Wilson, 2003
Pheidole verricula Wilson, 2003
Pheidole vestita Wilson, 2003
Pheidole veteratrix Forel, 1891
Pheidole victima Santschi, 1929
Pheidole victoris Forel, 1913
Pheidole vieti Eguchi, 2008
Pheidole vigilans (Smith, 1858)
Pheidole violacea Wilson, 2003
Pheidole virago Wheeler, 1915
Pheidole viriosa Wilson, 2003
Pheidole viserion Sarnat, Fischer & Economo, 2016
Pheidole viserion
Pheidole vistana Forel, 1914
Pheidole voasara Salata & Fisher, 2020
Pheidole vohemarensis Salata & Fisher, 2020
Pheidole volontany Salata & Fisher, 2020
Pheidole vomer Wilson, 2003
Pheidole vony Salata & Fisher, 2020
Pheidole vorax (Fabricius, 1804)
Pheidole voreios Salata & Fisher, 2020
Pheidole vulcan Fischer & Fisher, 2013
Pheidole vulgaris Eguchi, 2006

W

Pheidole walkeri Mann, 1922
Pheidole wallacei Mann, 1916
Pheidole wardi Wilson, 2003
Pheidole watsoni Forel, 1902
Pheidole weiseri Forel, 1910
Pheidole wheelerorum MacKay, 1988
Pheidole wiesei Wheeler, 1919
Pheidole williamsi Wheeler, 1919
Pheidole wilsoni Mann, 1921
Pheidole wolfringi Forel, 1908
Pheidole woodmasoni Forel, 1885
Pheidole wroughtonii Forel, 1902

X

Pheidole xanthocnemis Emery, 1914
Pheidole xanthogaster Wilson, 2003
Pheidole xerophila Wheeler, 1908
Pheidole xiloa Longino, 2019
Pheidole xocensis Forel, 1913
Pheidole xyston Wilson, 2003

Y

Pheidole yaqui Creighton & Gregg, 1955
Pheidole yeensis Forel, 1902
Pheidole yucatana Wilson, 2003

Z

Pheidole zennia Longino, 2019
Pheidole zavamanira Salata & Fisher, 2020
Pheidole zelata Wilson, 2003
Pheidole zeteki Smith, 1947
Pheidole zhoushanensis Li & Chen, 1992
Pheidole zirafy Salata & Fisher, 2020
Pheidole zoceana Santschi, 1925
Pheidole zoster Wilson, 2003

References

Pheidole